Francisco Maria Campos y Angeles (born 16 June 1860 in Actopan, Hidalgo – 29 June 1945) was a Mexican clergyman and bishop for the Roman Catholic Diocese of Chilpancingo-Chilapa, as well as for Roman Catholic Diocese of Tabasco. He became ordained in 1882. He was appointed bishop in 1897. He died on 29 June 1945, at the age of 85.

References

1860 births
1945 deaths
People from Actopan, Hidalgo
19th-century Roman Catholic bishops in Mexico
20th-century Roman Catholic bishops in Mexico